Velimir Milošević (1937–2004) was a Montenegrin Serb writer, poet, and editor.

External links
Poems

Bosnia and Herzegovina writers
1937 births
2004 deaths